The 1988 Hi-Tec British Open Squash Championships was held at Wembley in London from 13–18 April 1988. The event was won for the fifth consecutive year by Susan Devoy who defeated Liz Irving in the final.

Seeds

Draw and results

Qualifying round

First round

Second round

Quarter-finals

Semi-finals

Final

References

Women's British Open Squash Championships
Women's British Open Squash Championship
Women's British Open Squash Championship
Squash competitions in London
Women's British Open Squash Championship
British Open Squash Championship
Women's British Open Squash Championship